Manuel Hilario de Céspedes y García Menocal (born 11 March 1944) was the bishop of the Roman Catholic Diocese of Matanzas from 2005 to 2022. He studied for the priesthood in Venezuela and filled pastoral assignments there for twelve years before returning to his native Cuba, where he worked in the Diocese of Pinar del Rio until being appointed bishop.

Biography
De Céspedes was born in Havana, Cuba, on 11 March 1944. He is the great-great grandson of Carlos Manuel de Céspedes, the first president of Cuba, and the grandnephew of Mario García Menocal, the third. The Catholic writer and vicar general of the Archdiocese of Havana, Carlos Manuel de Céspedes y García-Menocal, was his brother.

He did his primary and secondary studies with the Marist Brothers  at La Vibora, a suburb of Havana and then immigrated to Puerto Rico where he received a doctorate in electrical engineering. In 1966, he entered the seminary for adult vocations in Caracas, Venezuela. He was ordained a priest for the Diocese of Pinar del Rio on 21 May 1972. He spent twelve years in the Archdiocese of Caracas and in 1984 returned to the Diocese of Pinar del Rio in Cuba. He worked as a parish priest there until 2002, when he became chancellor of the diocesan curia and then vicar general. He was also the assessor of the diocesan commission for culture and of the Catholic Center for Civic and religious training.

He was appointed Bishop of Matanzas on 7 May 2005 and received his episcopal consecration on 4 June in the cathedral in Pinar del Rio from José Siro González Bacallao, Bishop of the Pinar del Rio, assisted by Cardinal Jaime Lucas Ortega y Alamino, Archbishop of Havana and Pedro Meurice Estíu, Archbishop of Santiago de Cuba.

Pope Francis accepted his resignation on 22 March 2022.

References

External links
 

1944 births
21st-century Roman Catholic bishops in Cuba
Living people
Roman Catholic bishops of Matanzas